Clavatula ahuiri is a species of sea snails, a marine gastropod mollusc in the family Clavatulidae.

Description

Distribution
This species occurs in the Atlantic Ocean off Morocco

References

 Cossignani T. & Ardovini R. (2014) Clavatula ahuiri sp. n. (Gastropoda, Conidae) dal Marocco atlantico. Malacologia Mostra Mondiale 82: 12-13.

ahuiri
Gastropods described in 2014